Hapoel Rishon LeZion is an Hapoel sports club in the city of Rishon LeZion, Israel. it may refer to:

Hapoel Rishon LeZion F.C., the city association football club
Hapoel Rishon LeZion (handball), the city handball club